Provincial Route 36 is a  long paved highway located in the eastern province of Buenos Aires, in Argentina, which joins the Matanza River in the city of Avellaneda and the junction with Provincial Route 11, next to Samborombón Bay,  southeast of Pipinas.

Names of avenues
As this route passes through urban crossings, the different municipalities give it different names depending on the partido it crosses: 

 Avellaneda Partido: Avenida Presidente Bartolomé Mitre
 Quilmes Partido: Avenida Los Quilmes and Avenida Calchaquí
 Quilmes and Florencio Varela Partido: Avenida Calchaquí
 Florencio Varela and Berazategui Partido: Avenida Calchaquí
 Berazategui Partido: Avenida El Pato
 La Plata Partido: Calle 191

References

Provincial roads in Buenos Aires Province